is a former Japanese left-handed pitcher. He played for the Hanshin Tigers and Orix Buffaloes of Nippon Professional Baseball (NPB) and New York Yankees of Major League Baseball (MLB). He also played in the 2006 Major League Baseball Japan All-Star Series. Although he has not announced his retirement, Igawa does not belong to any professional team.

Professional career

Hanshin Tigers (1998–2006)
In his first full season as a starter, Igawa went 9–13 for the last-placed Tigers, but finished with a Central League second-best 2.67 ERA, behind only Chunichi's Shigeki Noguchi.

In 2002, Hanshin improved to fourth, and Igawa's record was 14–9. He finished third in ERA (2.49), trailing Masumi Kuwata and Kenshin Kawakami. He also led the Central League with 206 strikeouts.

In , the Tigers won the Central League pennant. Igawa made a great contribution with his brilliant performance. He pitched very well and finished with a 20–5 record, a 2.80 ERA, and was third with 179 strikeouts. He was named to the Best Nine, won the MVP in the Central League and also won the Eiji Sawamura Award, the Japanese equivalent of the MLB Cy Young Award.

In 2004, despite leading the league at 228 strikeouts, he went 14–11 with a 3.73 ERA. In 2005, Igawa went 13–9 with a 3.86 ERA, fifth among his team's starters in ERA, and was briefly exiled to the minors. He was only tied for fifth in strikeouts (down significantly to 145) and 10th in ERA, but was still third in the circuit in victories. While still a productive hurler, Igawa became a target of enthusiastic fan criticism due to his inability to perform at his prior level.

New York Yankees (2007–2011)

2007

In 2006, Igawa announced his intention to play in North America. On November 16, 2006, Igawa was posted by the Hanshin Tigers. On November 29, 2006, it was announced that the New York Yankees were the highest bidders at $26,000,194, with the last three digits representing his strikeout total for the 2006 season. He signed a five-year, $20 million contract on December 27, 2006. On January 8, Igawa was officially announced at a Yankee Stadium press conference. On April 7, 2007, he made his major league debut, allowing seven earned runs in five innings, but received a "no decision" because of Alex Rodriguez's walk-off grand slam. Igawa later earned wins in relief appearances against the Cleveland Indians and Boston Red Sox.

Igawa came to prominence in a game on April 28, in which starting pitcher Jeff Karstens left in the first inning after suffering a broken leg on a liner back to the mound. Igawa came in from the bullpen and pitched six innings of scoreless relief, allowing only two hits and striking out six batters before enjoying a standing ovation on his way to the dugout. He was the winning pitcher in the Yankees' 3–1 victory over their rival Boston Red Sox.

However, the Yankees later saw flaws in his mechanics and, on May 7, optioned him to the Florida State League's Tampa Yankees to work with Nardi Contreras and Billy Connors. Igawa apparently made progress in mechanics and location at Tampa, and was subsequently called up to pitch for the Triple-A Scranton/Wilkes Barre Yankees. Igawa made his return start against the San Francisco Giants on June 22, 2007, allowing two earned runs in 4.2 innings.

On July 27, 2007, Igawa was demoted to Triple-A Scranton/Wilkes-Barre. He was claimed on waivers by the San Diego Padres in August 2007, but the Yankees pulled him back without making a trade. Igawa returned to the Yankees in September 2007 when rosters expanded.

2008–2009
After failing to make the team out of spring training, Igawa started the year with Scranton/Wilkes Barre. He was called up to replace Ian Kennedy, In Igawa's first MLB start of the 2008 season, he gave up eleven hits and six runs in three innings. He was promoted again in June for one appearance before being optioned back to Scranton/Wilkes-Barre the next day. On July 26, 2008, Igawa cleared waivers and was removed from the 40-man roster.

In 2009, Igawa was invited to Spring training as a non-roster invitee, the only Yankee with a guaranteed contract in that position. On March 23, 2009, the Yankees reassigned Igawa to minor league camp. With the Scranton/Wilkes-Barre Yankees, Igawa posted a 10–8 record with a 4.15 ERA, with 105 strikeouts. The 10 wins, 105 strikeouts, and the 4.15 ERA were team bests for the 2009 year. On July 27, 2009, Igawa set a Scranton/Wilkes-Barre franchise record for most career wins, with a 2–1 victory over the Columbus Clippers.

During the 2008 and 2009 seasons, Yankee General manager Brian Cashman twice attempted to sell Igawa to a Japanese team, but Igawa refused to return to Japan both times.

2010–2011
In 2010, Igawa was invited to spring training as a non-roster invitee. However, on March 13, Igawa was once again cut and sent to AAA. In 2011, Igawa played most of the season for the Yankees' AA affiliate, the Trenton Thunder, but did pitch four games in AAA for the Scranton/Wilkes Barre Yankees where he went 1–0 with a 2.78 ERA.

Igawa had stated that he preferred to stay in the United States to play in MLB after his contract with the Yankees expired. He became a free agent after the 2011 season.

Orix Buffaloes (2012–2014)

The Orix Buffaloes of NPB signed Igawa to a two-year contract worth ¥200M prior to the 2012 season. Injuries were a problem for Igawa in his return to Japan; he made only 29 starts from 2012 to 2014.

Pitching style
Igawa's fastball will usually stay in the 87–90 mph range, but he is able to reach back and throw harder when in need of a strikeout (tops out at 93 mph).  Igawa also throws a changeup, which hovers in the 78–81 mph range, and a slider, which he uses primarily against left-handed batters. His changeup has a tendency to be belt-high and in the middle of the plate. This pitch drew a lot of swings and misses in Japan, but it did not have the same success in America. Igawa was known to possess above-average control in Japan, but has a very poor track record of control at the Major League level.

Igawa is also known for his unique follow-through, in which he throws his left leg into the air and return his pitching arm to a high position. Since he does not do this with his off-speed pitches as often as his fastballs, it might become easier for batters to distinguish whether a pitch is off-speed or not.

His record during day games in Japan was 4–5, 7.09 ERA. Considering the fact that Igawa pitches exceptionally better in night games, he wears sunglasses during day games to make the game environment closer to that of a night game.

Personal life
In February 2007, Igawa announced on his Japanese blog that he had married recently. His wife and children visit New York for a couple months per year. Igawa enjoys playing shogi. In January 2007, the Japanese Shogi Association appointed Igawa as the "shogi goodwill ambassador" to popularize shogi outside Japan, and presented the diploma of the first grade and the letter of the commission of authority to him. Igawa is a great soccer fan, but he joined the baseball club because there was no soccer club in his junior high school. Originally, he was a fan of the Kashima Antlers, which is based near his hometown of Ibaraki, but he became a Gamba Osaka fan after joining the Hanshin Tigers.

Awards in Japan
3-time All-Star (2001–2003)
2002 Strikeouts champion of the year
2003 Eiji Sawamura Award, Best Nine, Wins and ERA champion of the Central League, Central League MVP
2004 Strikeouts champion of the year
2006 Strikeouts champion of the Central League

References

External links

Official Website 
Sports Illustrated interview
Japanese league stats and info of Kei Igawa

1979 births
Hanshin Tigers players
Japanese expatriate baseball players in the United States
Living people
New York Yankees players
Nippon Professional Baseball MVP Award winners
Nippon Professional Baseball pitchers
Major League Baseball pitchers
Major League Baseball players from Japan
Orix Buffaloes players
Scranton/Wilkes-Barre Yankees players
Baseball people from Ibaraki Prefecture
Tampa Yankees players